Cyclommatus scutellaris is a beetle of the family Lucanidae.

Lucaninae
Beetles described in 1901